The 1999 Dreamland Egypt Classic doubles was the doubles event of the only edition of the Dreamland Egypt Classic; a WTA Tier III tournament and then the most prestigious women's tennis tournament held in Africa. Laurence Courtois and Arantxa Sánchez Vicario won in the final 7–5, 1–6, 7–6(7–3) against Irina Spîrlea and Caroline Vis.

Seeds

Draw

Qualifying

Seeds

Qualifiers
  Nadia Petrova /  Tina Pisnik

Qualifying draw

External links
 1999 Dreamland Egypt Classic Doubles Draw

Dreamland Egypt Classic
Dreamland Egypt Classic